The men's tournament of water polo at the 2009 Summer Universiade at Belgrade, Serbia began on July 2 and ended on July 12.

Teams

Preliminary round

Group A

Group B

Group C

Group D

Classification 13-16 places

Eightfinals

Classification 9-12 places

Quarterfinals

Classification 5-8 places

Semifinals

Finals

Final 15-16 places

Final 13-14 places

Final 11-12 places

Final 9-10 places

Final 7-8 places

Final 5-6 places

Bronze medal match

Final

Final standings

External links
Reports

Water polo at the 2009 Summer Universiade